Djamaa (also written Jama'a) is a town and commune in El Oued Province, Algeria. According to the 2008 census it has a population of 50,916, up from 37,438 in 1998, with an annual growth rate of 3.1%.

Geography 
To the east of Djamaa is a large area of palm plantations. The locality of Tigdidine lies amongst the palm trees.

Climate 

Djamaa has a hot desert climate (Köppen climate classification BWh), with very hot summers and mild winters, and very little precipitation throughout the year.

Transportation 

Djamaa has a station on the Biskra-Touggourt railway line. The N3 highway passes through the town, also connecting Biskra in the north to Touggourt in the south.

Education 

6.5% of the population has a tertiary education, and another 16.1% has completed secondary education. The overall literacy rate is 80.7%, and is 86.3% among males and 75.2% among females.

Localities 
The commune of Djamaa is composed of five localities:

 Djamaa
 Tigdidine
 Ourglana
 Sidi Yahia
 Mazer Zaouia

See also 

 Djema'a

References 

Neighbouring towns and cities

Communes of El Oued Province